Mahmoud Ibrahim (born 24 November 1937) is an Egyptian wrestler. He competed in the men's Greco-Roman lightweight at the 1964 Summer Olympics.

References

1937 births
Living people
Egyptian male sport wrestlers
Olympic wrestlers of Egypt
Wrestlers at the 1964 Summer Olympics
Place of birth missing (living people)